Skibice may refer to the following places:
Skibice, Kuyavian-Pomeranian Voivodeship (north-central Poland)
Skibice, Lublin Voivodeship (east Poland)
Skibice, Lubusz Voivodeship (west Poland)